"(If Paradise Is) Half as Nice" is a popular 1968 song originally written by the Italian singer-songwriter Lucio Battisti for La Ragazza 77, alias Ambra Borelli, in 1968 as "Il paradiso della vita" ("The paradise of the life"), and later in 1969 for Patty Pravo as "Il Paradiso" ("The paradise").

Amen Corner version
The song was translated into English by Jack Fishman. When it was offered to The Tremeloes as a potential single, they rejected it. Dave Clark 5 also wanted to record it and they did record the song. It was also recorded by Amen Corner as their debut single for their new record label, Immediate Records, and was produced by Shel Talmy. The most successful of the band's six hit singles, it reached number one on the UK Singles Chart for two weeks in February 1969, and number 34 when it was reissued in 1976.
There are two differing versions of the song by Amen Corner; one with orchestra and a prominent horn through the middle eight, and one version without either. However, the basic track and vocals appear the same in both.

Toby Jug version
The song was covered by Toby Jug and released in Australia in 1970, where it peaked at number 65.

Cover Versions
In 1978, Northern Irish pop rock band Rosetta Stone recorded the song and released it as a single.
In 1987, Bucks Fizz member Cheryl Baker recorded the song and released it as a single.
In 2010, mother and daughter Norma Waterson and Eliza Carthy recorded extracts of the song, along with Ukulele Lady, on their album Gift.

References

1969 singles
UK Singles Chart number-one singles
Song recordings produced by Shel Talmy
1968 songs
Lucio Battisti songs
Patty Pravo songs
Amen Corner (band) songs
Songs written by Lucio Battisti